Wyano is a census-designated place located in South Huntingdon Township, Westmoreland County in the state of Pennsylvania, United States.  The community is located just to west of Interstate 70.  As of the 2010 census the population was 484 residents.

References

Census-designated places in Westmoreland County, Pennsylvania